Sir Francis Alexander Newdigate Newdegate,  (31 December 1862 – 2 January 1936) was an English Conservative Party politician. After over twenty years in the House of Commons, he served as Governor of Tasmania from 1917 to 1920, and Governor of Western Australia from 1920 to 1924.

Early life and family
Born in 1862, he was the son of Lieutenant Colonel Francis William Newdigate and his first wife Charlotte Elizabeth Agnes Sophia Woodford, and grandson of Francis Parker Newdigate. He was educated at Eton and the Royal Military College, Sandhurst, and was commissioned into the Grenadier Guards in 1883. He married Elizabeth Sophia Lucia Bagot on 13 October 1888.

Newdegate inherited estates at Arbury Hall, near Nuneaton and at Harefield, near Uxbridge, on the death of his father in 1893, and uncle Sir Edward Newdegate in 1902. He assumed the additional surname "Newdegate", differently spelt, under the terms of the will of a kinsman Charles Newdigate Newdegate, in September 1902. In 1911 he erected, at Arbury Hall, a monument to the memory of George Eliot, whose father had been employed on the Arbury estate.

Career
Newdegate was Member of Parliament for Nuneaton from 1892 to 1906, and for Tamworth from 1909 to 1917. He was on 14 February 1917 appointed Steward of the Manor of Northstead, a mechanism for resigning from the House of Commons, on his appointment as Governor of Tasmania.

Newdegate was appointed a Knight Commander of the Order of St Michael and St George in 1917 upon his appointment as Governor of Tasmania (1917 to 1920). He was appointed Governor of Western Australia in 1920 where he served until 1924. On retirement he was promoted to Knight Grand Cross of the Order of St Michael and St George in 1925. The Western Australian town of Newdegate is named after him.

Later life and death
Newdegate was appointed High Steward of the Royal Town of Sutton Coldfield in 1925. On his death in 1936 his estates passed to his daughter Lucia, who in 1919, had married John Maurice Fitzroy, father of the 3rd Viscount Daventry.

Personal life
He was a friend of Sir Alexander Russell Downer, who built a large home and gardens in the Adelaide Hills in South Australia and named it Arbury Park after the Newdigate family home.

See also
Newdigate family

References

External links
 
 
 http://www.irsociety.co.uk/Archives/47/Griff.htm
 http://thepeerage.com/p6293.htm
 http://adbonline.anu.edu.au/biogs/A110008b.htm

 

|-

1862 births
1936 deaths
Grenadier Guards officers
Governors of Tasmania
Governors of Western Australia
Knights Grand Cross of the Order of St Michael and St George
Conservative Party (UK) MPs for English constituencies
People educated at Eton College
Politicians from London
People from Nuneaton
UK MPs 1892–1895
UK MPs 1895–1900
UK MPs 1900–1906
UK MPs 1906–1910
UK MPs 1910
UK MPs 1910–1918
Graduates of the Royal Military College, Sandhurst
British emigrants to Australia